Trott Nchilo Moloto (born 19 July 1956 in Pietersburg) is a South African Association football coach.

Coaching career

Among others, he previously coached South Africa, Mamelodi Sundowns, Maritzburg United and also had a stint at Tanzanian club Simba SC. leading Mamelodi Sundowns to a stunning 11 wins a row.

References 

1956 births
Living people
South African soccer managers
South Africa national soccer team managers
People from Polokwane
Mamelodi Sundowns F.C. managers
2000 African Cup of Nations managers
Sportspeople from Limpopo